Marcia Chatelain (born 1979) is an American academic who serves as a professor of history and African American studies at Georgetown University in Washington, DC. In 2021, she was awarded the Pulitzer Prize for History for her book Franchise: The Golden Arches in Black America, which also won a James Beard Award.

She is also the creator of the Ferguson Syllabus social media campaign and the author of South Side Girls: Growing up in the Great Migration.

Biography

Education and career 
Chatelain was born in 1979 in Chicago, Illinois. Raised in Chicago, she attended St. Ignatius College Prep.

She graduated from the University of Missouri in 2001, with degrees in journalism and religious studies. She then worked as the Resident Scholar at the Harry S. Truman Scholarship Foundation. Chatelain received her A.M. and Ph.D. in American Civilization from Brown University, graduating in 2008, and was awarded the University of California-Santa Barbara's Black Studies Dissertation Fellowship. Chatelain worked as the Reach for Excellence Assistant Professor of Honors and African American Studies at the University of Oklahoma’s Honors College, before becoming a Provost's Distinguished Associate Professor of history and African American studies at Georgetown University.

#FergusonSyllabus 
In 2014, following the shooting of Michael Brown in Ferguson, Missouri, Chatelain mobilized other scholars on Twitter to talk about what was happening in Ferguson with their students and  contribute to a crowdsourced reading list. The result became known as the #FergusonSyllabus. Its success has led to other crowdsourced syllabi to respond to national tragedies. In 2016, the Chronicle of Higher Education named Chatelain a Top Influencer in academic, in recognition of the success of #FergusonSyllabus.

Podcasting 
In 2017, Chatelain contributed to the "Undisclosed" podcast as a resident historian. As of August 2020, she hosted the Slate podcast "The Waves" on feminism, gender, and popular culture.

Awards, honors, and service 
Chatelain has received awards from the Ford Foundation, the American Association of University Women, and the German Marshall Fund of the United States. She has won teaching awards at Georgetown, where she serves on the Working Group on Slavery, Memory, and Reconciliation. In 2019, Chatelain was named an Andrew Carnegie Fellow. She also served as an Eric and Wendy Schmidt Fellow at the New America Foundation.

In 2021, Chatelain was awarded the Pulitzer Prize for History for her book Franchise: The Golden Arches in Black America. It won a 2022 James Beard Foundation Book Award for Writing.

Works 
Chatelain has published two books: South Side Girls: Growing up in the Great Migration (Duke University Press, 2015), about the history of Chicago's Great Migration through the lens of black girls and Franchise: The Golden Arches in Black America (Liveright/W.W. Norton, 2020) about the history of the relationship between civil rights and the fast food industry.

Personal life 
Chatelain is Catholic.

References

External links 

 Official website
 Twitter
 Google Scholar

University of Missouri alumni
Historians of African Americans
21st-century American historians
American women historians
African-American historians
Living people
People from Chicago
Georgetown University faculty
Brown University alumni
21st-century American women writers
Writers from Chicago
Historians from Illinois
Pulitzer Prize for History winners
21st-century African-American women writers
21st-century African-American writers
African-American Catholics
1979 births